Two disciplines of cycling will be contested at the 2017 Games of the Small States of Europe; road cycling and mountain biking. A total of eight medal events will be held.

Medal table

Medal summary

Road cycling

Mountain biking

Results

Men's road race

References

External links 
Cycling road results
Cycling mountain biking results
Cycling road − Results book
Cycling mountain biking − Results book

2017 Games of the Small States of Europe
2017
Games of the Small States of Europe
Cycling in San Marino
2017 in road cycling
2017 in mountain biking